Sahil Sharma (born 2 July 1995), better known by his stage name Zaeden, is a singer and record producer.

Early life and career beginnings
Zaeden was born in Gurugram, India to Latika and Ashish Sharma. He also has a sister named Sanjana Sharma. Growing up, he attended The Heritage School, where he played the tabla and piano throughout school. At the age of 14, he began performing as a DJ. He briefly studied mass communication at Amity University, Noida before relocating to Mumbai to study sound engineering.

Sharma stated that his given name was too common in India, and so he chose the stage name "Zaeden" as it meant "out of the box thinking" in Latin.

Career
Sharma began his career at the age of 14, by mixing tapes of dance music releases and distributing them among his friends, which led him to release his first single titled "Land of Lords" in 2014. That same year, his remix of Coldplay's "Magic" aired on Dutch DJ Hardwell's radio show Hardwell On Air, making him one of the youngest DJs to be featured on the show. He further released his official remix of Maroon 5's single "Don't Wanna Know" that year.

In 2015, he signed with Spinnin' Records and released his single "Yesterday," a collaborative effort with American DJ Borgeous.

In 2016, Sharma was a closing act for DJ David Guetta's Mumbai concert. That same year, he became one of the few Indian artists to have performed at the Tomorrowland Festival in Belgium, where he premiered "Yesterday" along with his remix of Justin Bieber's "Love Yourself." In July of that year, Sharma released his second single under Spinnin' titled "Never Let You Go," a collaborative effort with DJ duo Nina & Malika. The track featured vocals by Cimo Frankel, and the subsequent music video was shot across Europe. He was also featured on GQ magazine's 'Best Dressed List 2016' and MensXP's list of ‘Top 50 Indians who defined fashion in 2016.' He also spoke at the TEDx conference at The Heritage School that year.

In 2017, Sharma released his official remix of Maroon 5's collaborative effort with American rapper Kendrick Lamar, "Don't Wanna Know." He also released his third single titled "City of the Lonely Hearts" featuring Cimo Frankel. That same year, he was one of the opening acts for the Mumbai date on Justin Bieber's Purpose World Tour.

He represented India at Tomorrowland, Marenostrum, as well as clubs like Ushuaïa, Pacha, and Privilege in Ibiza.

On 5 September 2019, Zaeden released his first Hindi non-film song, "tere bina" on VYRL, Universal Music along with a music video featuring Amyra Dastur. A few weeks later, he released its acoustic version with Jonita Gandhi. A regular performer at Tomorrowland, he debuted "tere bina" during his third appearance there.

During the time India was in a lockdown, he went on to release four more singles, "kya karoon?", "dooriyan", "intezaar," and "socha na tha". He also collaborated with Lost Stories for "Noor," and Sez on the Beat for "Kahaani 2020". All the tracks garnered positive response from the audiences and the industry veterans alike. In 2021, he released his debut album titled "Genesis 1:1". It featured 11 tracks.

Zaeden has tied up with international brands such as Gucci,Puma, Fossil, Axe, Tinder, and Bumble. For Puma’s classic collection, ‘Future Riders,’ he shot a couple of digital properties with Bollywood actress Sara Ali Khan. The 25-year-old has been featured on GQ’s Best Dressed and MensXP's ‘Top 50 Indians who defined fashion in 2016’ list. He has collaborated with designers Shantanu & Nikhil, and Siddhartha Tytler.

Discography

References

Living people
21st-century Indian musicians
Indian DJs
Progressive house musicians
1995 births
Indian electronic musicians
Musicians from Haryana
Electronic dance music DJs